Heraldic badges of the Royal Air Force are the insignia of certain commands, squadrons, units, wings, groups, branches and stations within the Royal Air Force. They are also commonly known as crests, especially by serving members of the Royal Air Force, but officially they are badges. Each badge must be approved by the reigning monarch of the time, and as such will either have a King's or Queen's Crown upon the top of the badge, dependent upon which monarch granted approval and the disbandment date of the unit. The approval process involves a member of the College of Arms (the Inspector of RAF Badges) who acts as an advisory on all matters pertaining to the design and suitability of the insignia and motto.

Some badges that have been approved by either King Edward VIII or George VI will have simply adopted the Queen's Crown after her accession in 1952. The number of badges that King Edward VIII signed is limited due to his short time on the throne.

History
The first badge adopted by the RAF was the official Royal Air Force Badge, and was instituted on 1 August 1918, some four months after the formation of the Royal Air Force. Afterwards, units and squadrons adopted their own insignia and used them in a way similar to a regimental colour. For some squadrons, their unofficial badges would pre-date the formation of the RAF. Most Royal Flying Corps squadrons during the First World War would paint their squadron emblem (or device) upon a shield to hang up in the mess or squadron bar. They often viewed themselves as 'knights of the air' and the badge helped foster a sense of identity on and with the squadron.

In the case of 100 Squadron, their badge incorporated a skull and crossbones insignia that had been liberated from a French "house of ill-repute" in 1918. Some mascots were back formations from the badge rather than supplying the idea for the badge. No. 234 Squadron had "..a dragon rampant, with flames issuing from the mouth.." approved by King George VI in August 1940. By 1956, the squadron were at RAF Geilenkirchen in Germany and were looking for a suitable mascot for their squadron based on its dragon insignia; they reportedly would settle for an iguana.

Until the early 1930s, squadrons and units would use their own informal badges and insignia. In 1935, the process of formalising the badges was undertaken whereby an official heraldic approval would be granted by the ruling monarch of the time. The whole design process would ultimately rest with the Chester Herald as the Inspector of RAF Badges. This has changed over the years and has been filled by Clarenceux King of Arms and by the Surrey Herald of Arms Extraordinary. The Inspector of RAF Badges would liaise with squadrons and units to finalise designs that would reflect already adopted insignia or to utilise something suitable to recognise the squadron or unit. An Air Ministry Order (A.8/1936) was issued in January 1936 and detailed the criteria for badges and their ultimate approval via the Chester Herald and the king. In June of the same year, King Edward VIII approved the first raft of badges for numbers 4, 15, 18, 19, 22, 33, 201, 207, 216 and 604 Squadrons.

When a new badge is granted an approval by the reigning monarch, the unit or squadron is presented with the original goatskin painting signed by the monarch and copies will be made and drawn to the standard set by the original. The Inspector of RAF badges keeps copies which are registered in large albums known as "The inspectors ordinary copies". A badge is 'ensigned' on the top with either a King's or a Queen's Crown; this depends on which particular monarch was ruling at the time. For Edward VIII and George VI, a King's (or Tudor Crown) is used. The number of badges approved by Edward VIII are small in number; the period between his accession to the throne and his abdication lasted only eleven months. As the first batch of badges for the approvals process was completed in July 1936, most badges were approved by his two successors (King George VI and Queen Elizabeth II). The granting of a badge is a personal honour between the monarch and unit that has been awarded the badge, and is not conferred upon the RAF as a whole.

Any serving unit could apply for a badge and some did, whereas others did not or had their application thwarted by time; in the case of No. 273 Squadron, their badge was still awaiting final approval after several re-submissions when it had been rejected by Air Command South-East Asia and by the Inspector of Badges. This hinged upon the proposed use of an Asian Fylfot, which strongly resembles a Swastika. The squadron was disbanded in 1945 before being issued a badge due to uncertainty on a design or motto. A campaign in 1996 to have the badge issued for the veterans of No. 273 Squadron was unsuccessful despite the backing of several MP's, and it was finally awarded to the squadron association in principle. If a unit could not adhere to the qualifying heraldic criteria, then a badge would not be issued. Where badges had not been issued or even applied for, a badge of a higher authority could be used instead (RAF Cowden in East Yorkshire used the Strike Command badge as it was an air weapons range, RAF Bridgnorth used the badge of No. 7 School of Recruit Training as that was the station's reason for existence). The rules regarding badges were changed over the years and since 1992, public funds could be used to pay for the badge design where previously money had to be raised by the squadron or unit to pay for the process. Additionally, a unit must have been in existence for five years (and expect to be in existence for another five years) and also have a personnel strength of more than 75.

Under certain circumstances, badges from defunct units have been resurrected when new units or wings have been formed, but squadron badges are not usually reassigned as normally the squadron just assumes an old number and accepts that badge and motto. When the Force Generation Wing (FGW) from No. 90 Signals Unit at RAF Leeming was re-formed as the Operational Information Services Wing (OISW), it was approved for a close copy version of the former No. 60 Group (Signals) badge; the only difference being the name of the unit was changed, and the indentations where the unit number used to be on the main badge, were removed.

Approval and design of badges extends to all units associated with the Royal Air Force; Regular, Reserve, Auxiliary and Air Training Corps.

Over 800 squadron and unit badges, carved from Welsh slate, are set into the floor of the central church of the Royal Air Force, St Clements Danes, London. The first carved badge was placed in the floor by its carver, Madge Whiteman, in 1958. Whiteman would go on to carve at least 80 more and the intention at the time was for there to eventually be 1,000 badges set into the floor. In 1996, the RAF Heraldry Trust was set up to paint every badge issued to either Royal Air Force or Commonwealth Air Forces where an approved badge was issued. A vast replica selection of RAF badges adorn the walls of the RAF Club in London.

Design
The badge itself consists of five distinct parts; 
 the crown - either a Kings or Queen's Crown dependent on when it was issued
 the body - a circular frame coloured with RAF blue and with indentations for operationally numbered units, surrounded by a wreath of leaves
 the insignia within the body (known as the Blazon in heraldry)
 the scroll
 the motto that is inlaid upon the scroll. 

RAF Badges are often called 'crests', even by serving members of the military, but they are in fact, heraldic badges. Crests is a common misnomer and represents just one part of a badge in heraldic terms. A crest is usually atop a coat of arms, and not RAF badges as they ensigned by a crown. In true heraldry, a coat of arms (or badge) can have a crest or not, but  a crest cannot exist on its own. One exception to this is No. 600 Squadron, which has two badges, the first was the traditional badge with a sword in front of a crescent moon which reflected the squadron's night-time activities. The second badge, also known affectionately by the squadron as "The Dust-Cart Crest", was the badge of the City of London Arms. As this had the appearance of the RAF eagle at the top and not the crown, this could be interpreted as a crest.
 
One of the few squadrons to not have a scroll is No. 607 Squadron as it does not have a motto. Many mottoes were suggested for 607 Squadron, which have been described as being from "suitable to the ribald."

Squadrons and stations
Flying squadrons were additionally expected to display their badge (or the main insignia/blazon from it) on their aircraft. This was also to be enhanced by the addition of a white shape behind the badge or insignia that would aid in seeing the badge and the particular shape would denote the role of the squadron; either a fighter, bomber or reconnaissance squadron, though some doubled up on their role. Non-flying units would display their badge on a sign either at the entrance to the base or outside the station headquarters.

One of the first squadrons to be awarded their badge was No. 18 Squadron, who had a winged white pegasus as their insignia which dated back to the First World War. When the badge was approved in 1936, the pegasus had been redrawn with a more upright rearing stance and was now painted in gules (which is the colour red in heraldry). No. 208 Squadron had been in Egypt for 17 years when they asked for approval for their squadron badge. Due to their motto of Vigilant and the nature of their work (observation), they had been using the Eye of Horus as their squadron insignia. The Chester Herald informed the squadron that the use of an eye was considered unlucky in English Heraldry, so the squadron adopted the Giza Sphinx as their insignia instead. The badge was approved by King George VI in October 1937. Another squadron with associations in Egypt was No. 45 Squadron, who had a winged camel on their badge. This represented the fact the squadron was equipped with Sopwith Camel aircraft in the First World War and its association with the Middle-East in the Second World War.

The badge of No. 22 Squadron has a red disc (torteaux) with a Maltese Cross and the symbol for pi. This is because when No. 7 Squadron and 22 Sqn were stationed together during the First World War, 22 Sqn would take off directly over the 7 Sqn Lines (accommodation) and the fraction 22/7 approximates to pi. No. 81 Squadron badge has a red star (mullet) of Russia as its insignia. The Russians awarded the squadron the star when they took Hawker Hurricanes out to Murmansk to train the Soviet crews during the Second World War.

Squadrons would often use insignia reflecting where they had served, RAF stations would more often than not use a local landmark or item particular to that area. RAF St Eval had a church in the middle of their badge (St Uvelus) which, when the airfield was being built, was under threat of demolition. It survived and became a repository for remembrance of fallen comrades. It also acted as a sign to crews that they were nearly home. RAF Scampton's badge has a bow and arrow insignia. The station badge for RAF Waddington consists of a small part of Lincoln Cathedral, again a focussing point for crews returning from active missions. The badge was not approved until 1954 by Elizabeth II.

Other stations had badges designed to reflect their role. In 1957, RAF Marham was awarded their new badge which depicted a blue bull as its insignia and the motto of Deter. The motto indicated their base's new role in the nuclear deterrent role and the bull symbolised that deterrence. The colour blue is thought to have a been a nod towards the Blue Danube, the RAF's first atomic bomb.

Mottoes
Mottoes convey the spirit of the unit or squadron; for commands and training stations, this was usually about what the intended output of that particular role was. Both Bomber and Fighter Commands had badges where the blazon and motto reflected that role. Bomber Command's motto was Strike hard, strike sure, whilst Fighter command had the motto of Offence defence. Elements of both blazons and mottoes were included in the Strike Command badge that superseded both Bomber and Fighter Command when they were combined as Strike Command in 1968. No. 617 Squadron's motto is Après moi le déluge which translates from the French as "After me, the flood". This reflected the reason that the squadron was created; to bomb the dams in the Ruhr Valley. King George VI approved the badge for 617 Squadron in March 1944, some ten months after the Dambusters Raid. Most mottoes are written in Latin or English, though other languages were used; 
 

No. 100 Squadron had their badge awarded in 1938 whilst posted to RAF Seletar and opted to have the motto (Sarang tebuan jengan dijolok; "Never stir up a hornets nest") written in Malaysian. The squadron blazon was traditionally a skull and crossbones (which it retains on its badge) with the motto Blood and Bones. While the squadron was posted to RNAS Donibristle in Fife, they replaced the skull and crossbones motif with a bulldog and the motto Nemo me impune lacessit, ("No-one provokes me with impunity"), but reverted to the old motif and motto soon afterwards.

Other badges were also approved for locational reasons; No. 240 Squadron had a badge adorned with a Viking helmet and the motto of Sjo vordur lopt vordur which is Icelandic for "Guardian of the sea and air". Badges were also approved for the squadrons in the non-UK range (IE  squadrons in the 300–399 and 400–499 ranges - the Article XV squadrons) such as No. 330 Squadron who had a Viking Longship and the motto of Trygg havet, which was in Norwegian, appropriately enough, (as it was a Norwegian Squadron) meaning "Guarding the seas." The badges approved to Dominion (or Commonwealth) crews would traditionally incorporate insignia with a connection to the homeland to which the crews flying the aircraft belonged to. No. 266 (Rhodesia) Squadron had their badge approved in August 1941 with a Bateleur eagle and the motto of Hlabezulu which derives from Shona meaning "The stabber of the sky." Badges were issued to non-flying units such as the Iraq Levies, who had a badge approved by King George VI in 1949 that had two crossed Khanjar as its insignia and the motto of Ready.

Heraldic terminology

The component elements of badges are described – with regard to stances, positions, actions, attitudes and tinctures (colours) – by the use of heraldic blazon. The most common terms used are listed below. For example, No. 102 Squadron badge (shown on the right) is described as "On a demi-terrestrial globe azure & dark blue a lion rampant guardant gules holding in the forepaws a bomb sable".

Gallery

Notes

References

Sources

Further reading

External links

RAF webpage with badges as links to current RAF Stations
RAF Heraldry Trust
RAF Museum webpage detailing 'spooky' badges for Halloween
The story of No. 171 Squadron RAF and their badge, which ended up not being issued

Royal Air Force
Military heraldry
British military insignia
Military logos
Royal Air Force crests